In logic, inference is the process of deriving logical conclusions from premises known or assumed to be true. In checking a logical inference for formal and material validity, the meaning of only its logical vocabulary and of both its logical and extra-logical vocabulary
is considered, respectively.

Examples
For example, the inference "Socrates is a human, and each human must eventually die, therefore Socrates must eventually die" is a formally valid inference; it remains valid if the nonlogical vocabulary "Socrates", "is human", and "must eventually die" is arbitrarily, but consistently replaced.

In contrast, the inference "Montreal is north of New York, therefore New York is south of Montreal" is materially valid only; its validity relies on the extra-logical relations "is north of" and "is south of" being converse to each other.

Material inferences vs. enthymemes
Classical formal logic considers the above "north/south" inference as an enthymeme, that is, as an incomplete inference; it can be made formally valid by supplementing the tacitly used conversity relationship explicitly: "Montreal is north of New York, and whenever a location x is north of a location y, then y is south of x; therefore New York is south of Montreal".

In contrast, the notion of a material inference has been developed by Wilfrid Sellars in order to emphasize his view that such supplements are not necessary to obtain a correct argument.

Brandom on material inference

Non-monotonic inference
Robert Brandom adopted Sellars' view, arguing that everyday (practical) reasoning is usually non-monotonic, i.e. additional premises can turn a practically valid inference into an invalid one, e.g.
 "If I rub this match along the striking surface, then it will ignite." (p→q)
 "If p, but the match is inside a strong electromagnetic field, then it will not ignite." (p∧r→¬q)
 "If p and r, but the match is in a Faraday cage, then it will ignite." (p∧r∧s→q)
 "If p and r and s, but there is no oxygen in the room, then the match will not ignite." (p∧r∧s∧t→¬q)
 ...
Therefore, practically valid inference is different from formally valid inference (which is monotonic - the above argument that Socrates must eventually die cannot be challenged by whatever additional information), and should better be modelled by materially valid inference. While a classical logician could add a ceteris paribus clause to 1. to make it usable in formally valid inferences:
 "If I rub this match along the striking surface, then, ceteris paribus, it will inflame."
However, Brandom doubts that the meaning of such a clause can be made explicit, and prefers to consider it as a hint to non-monotony rather than a miracle drug to establish monotony.

Moreover, the "match" example shows that a typical everyday inference can hardly be ever made formally complete. In a similar way, Lewis Carroll's dialogue "What the Tortoise Said to Achilles" demonstrates that the attempt to make every inference fully complete can lead to an infinite regression.

See also
Material inference should not be confused with the following concepts, which refer to formal, not material validity:
 Material conditional — the logical connective "→" (i.e. "formally implies") 
 Material implication (rule of inference) — a rule for formally replacing "→" by "¬" (negation) and "∨" (disjunction)

Notes

Citations

References
 Stanford Encyclopedia of Philosophy on Sellars view

Non-classical logic
Inference